Kirchamba  is a village and commune of the Cercle of Diré in the Tombouctou Region of Mali. As of 1998 the commune had a population of 2,305.

History
Kirchamba was founded by the Kehath (Ka'ti) family, Spanish Sephardi Jews who were descended from Ismael Jan Kot Al-yahudi of Scheida in Southern Morocco. The Kehath (Ka'ti) family settled in the Songhai Empire in 1492. The Kehath family later converted to Islam along with the rest of the local non-Muslim population.

See also
Jews of Bilad el-Sudan

References

Communes of Tombouctou Region
Historic Jewish communities in West Africa
Jews and Judaism in Mali
Moroccan diaspora in Africa
Moroccan-Jewish diaspora
Sephardi Jewish culture in Africa
Spanish diaspora in Africa
Spanish-Jewish diaspora